John Harris may refer to:

Politics

Australia
 John Harris (Australian settler) (1754–1838), military surgeon, magistrate, and landowner in Australia
 John Harris (New South Wales politician) (1838–1911), Australian colonial politician, mayor of Sydney
 John Harris (Victorian politician) (1868–1946), Australian politician and Country Party minister
 John Harris (Australian politician) (1890–1974), Australian senator

United Kingdom
 John Harris (MP for Hampshire) (died 1429), English MP for Hampshire 1415
 John Harris (MP for Grampound), English MP for Grampound, 1555
 John Harris (MP for West Looe) (c. 1564–1623), English MP for West Looe, 1614
 John Harris (MP for Montgomery) (died 1626), MP for Montgomery, 1601
 John Harris (Bere Alston MP) (1586–1657), English MP for Bere Alston and Launceston
 John Harris (Royalist) (1596–1648), English MP for Liskeard, 1628, 1640, 1644
 John Harris (died 1677) (1631–1677), English MP for Liskeard
 John Harris (merchant), British Member of Parliament for Exeter, 1708
 John Harris (courtier) (died 1767), British Member of Parliament for Ashburton
 John Harris (1703–1768), British Member of Parliament for Barnstaple
 John Harris (Bristol) (1725–1801), English merchant who was Mayor of Bristol in 1790
 John Dove Harris (1809–1878), English Liberal politician
 John Harris (engineer) (1812–1869), railway engineer of the Stockton and Darlington Railway 1836–47.
 John Harris (anti-slavery campaigner) (1874–1940), English missionary, campaigner against slavery, and Liberal Party politician
 John Harris, Baron Harris of Greenwich (1930–2001), British political aide and politician for Labour and Liberal Democrats
 John Quincey Harris (1815–1846), British Whig politician

United States
 John Harris (New York politician) (1760–1824), Congressman from New York
 John Harris (Wisconsin politician) (1856–1933), Wisconsin state senator and businessman
 John S. Harris (1825–1906), United States Senator from Louisiana
 John T. Harris (1823–1899), United States Representative and lawyer from Virginia
 John Harris (Alaska politician) (born 1957), member of the Alaska House of Representatives
 John F. Harris (political aide) (born 1962), chief of staff for Illinois governor Rod Blagojevich
 John F. Harris (politician) (died 1913), American lawyer and politician from Greenville, Mississippi

Elsewhere
 John Hyde Harris (1826–1886), New Zealand politician
 John Bruce Harris (1903–1983), Canadian political figure in Saskatchewan
 John Gordon Harris (1947–2019), Canadian policeman

Academics
 John Harris (Warden) (1588–1658), English academic, clergyman, Warden of Winchester College
 John Harris (college head) (1802–1856), Congregational minister and college president
 John Howard Harris (1847–1925), president of Bucknell University, 1889–1919
 John Harris (bioethicist) (born 1945), professor of bioethics and think tank director
 John Harris (physicist) (born 1950), physics professor at Yale University
 John R. Harris (1934–2018), professor of economics at Boston University
John Harris (phonologist), Irish linguist
John Harris (psycholinguist), Irish linguist
John Harris (biblical scholar), Australian biblical scholar and creolist

Business
 John Harris Sr. (1673–1748), trader who settled and established Harrisburg, Pennsylvania
 John Harris (surveyor) (died 1772), farmer, land surveyor and political figure in Nova Scotia
 John Harris Jr. (settler) (1716–1791), American storekeeper and frontiersman
 John Williams Harris (1808–1872), New Zealand trader, whaler, and farmer
 John Harris (manufacturer) (1841–1887), Canadian businessman and manufacturer
 John P. Harris (1871–1926), Pittsburgh businessman
 John C. Harris (born 1943), owner of Harris Farms

Entertainment and writers
 John Harris (writer) (1666–1719), English writer, scientist, and Anglican priest
 John Harris (spinet maker) (died 1772), Boston maker of spinets and harpsichords
 John Harris (publisher) (1756–1846), English bookseller and printseller
 John Harris Jr. (artist) (1791–1873), English artist
 John Harris (poet) (1820–1884), Cornish poet
 John H. Harris (entertainment) (1898–1969), American, first owner of the Ice Capades
 John Harris (novelist) (1916–1991), British author
 John Harris (curator) (1931–2022), English author, architectural historian
 John Harris (artist) (born 1948), painter and illustrator known for his science-fiction work
 John T. Harris (artist) (1908–1972), painter, printmaker, educator
 John Harris (critic) (born 1969), music and politics journalist
 John F. Harris (born 1960s), author and writer for Politico.com
 John Wyndham (John Wyndham Parkes Lucas Beynon Harris, 1903–1969), English science fiction author
 John Harris (software developer), computer programmer of Atari computer games

Military
 John Harris (USMC officer) (1793–1864), 6th Commandant of the United States Marine Corps
 John Harris (Medal of Honor) (1839–?), Union Navy officer and Medal of Honor recipient
 Sir John Harris (RAF officer), British Royal Air Force officer

Religion
 John Harris (bishop) (1680–1738), Bishop of Llandaff, 1729–1738
 John Harris (priest) (1932–2019), Dean of Brecon

Sports

Cricket
 John Harris (New Zealand cricketer) (1825–1886), New Zealand cricketer
 John Harris (English cricketer) (1936–2019), for Somerset County Cricket Club

Football
 John Harris (Australian footballer) (1903–1993), former VFL player with Collingwood
 John Harris (footballer, born 1917) (1917–1988), Scottish footballer and manager
 John Harris (footballer, born 1939), English footballer
 John Harris (Irish footballer), Northern Irish footballer and cricketer
 John Harris (defensive back) (born 1933), former American football cornerback
 John Harris (safety) (born 1955), former American football safety
 John Harris (wide receiver) (born 1991), American football player
 Tony Harris (footballer) (John Robert Harris, 1922–2000), Scottish footballer

Other sports
 John Harris (canoeist) (born 1938), British canoeist
 John Harris (slalom canoeist) (born 1959), American slalom canoeist
 John Harris (athlete) (born 1945), Welsh Paralympic athlete
 John Harris (golfer) (born 1952), professional golfer
 John Harris (first baseman) (born 1954), former Major League Baseball player
 John Harris (pitcher), American Negro league pitcher 
 John Elmo Harris (1952–2005), professional wrestler and actor, whose ring name was Silo Sam

Other
 Frederick John Harris (1937–1965), known as John Harris, anti-apartheid activist
 John S. Harris (horticulturalist) (1826–1901), American horticulturalist
 John Richardson Harris (1790–1829), early settler of Mexican Texas
 John Solomon Harris, English Jewish pacifist

See also
 Johnny Harris (disambiguation)
 Jack Harris (disambiguation)
 Jonathan Harris (disambiguation)
 John H. Harris (disambiguation)